TV Zimbo is the first private TV station in Angola. TV Zimbo is owned by the private media publisher Medianova.

History
TV Zimbo was founded on 14 December 2008 and started regular programming on 15 May 2009, in time for the 2009 elections and the 2010 Africa Cup of Nations. Medianova had just launched a weekly newspaper, O Pais, and a radio station, Radio Mais (first private broadcaster in Angola). The channel was launched in partnership with TVI and the BBC. 310 employees, including an editorial staff of 22, were hired. Medianova invested $26 million in the launch of TV Zimbo. The name Zimbo originated from the first local currency used in Angola and almost the entire West African coast, a conch the size of a coffee bean, which appeared all along the coast of Angola.

It appeared later that TV Zimbo did not launch with the necessary legal regulations. In November 2010, following a financial turmoil at Medianova, 75% of TV Zimbo's employees, mostly Portuguese expatriates, were laid off and replaced by local technicians.

In mid-2011, Brazilian William Corrêa restructures TV Zimbo. Updated and purchased more modern equipment, adopted new procedures in journalism, commercials, programming, etc. Created marketing and animation departments.

In 2014, TV Zimbo migrated to HD TV.

During the presidential elections in August 2017, the Angolan Journalists' Union criticized TV Zimbo for favoring the MPLA's share of voice, giving 227 minutes to MPLA members, and 30 minutes to other parties between the 4th and the 14th of August 2017.

In July 2020, the Angolan Attorney General arrested the Media Nova, for being created with funds from Government of Angola and which was formerly Angolan president José Eduardo dos Santos and generals "Kopelipa" e "Dino". And, then, it temporarily passed into state tutelage indefinitely.

Distribution
TV Zimbo is broadcast by private subscription satellite TV broadcasters ZAP and DStv as well as by private cable provider TV Cabo Angola.

See also
Televisão Pública de Angola
Quem Quer Ser Milionário? (Angolan TV show)

References

External links
TV Zimbo Web site
Corporate Web site of Medianova Group
Livestream TV Zimbo

Television stations in Angola
Television channels in Angola
Television channels and stations established in 2008